FC Juniors OÖ is an Austrian association football club, from Pasching, Upper Austria. It was newly founded after the move of ASKÖ Pasching, who last appeared as FC Superfund, to Carinthia and the associated renaming in SK Austria Kärnten in 2007 as FC Superfund Pasching. The greatest success of the club is winning the ÖFB-Cup as the first third division in the history of the competition in the 2012–13 season and the associated qualification for the play-offs of the 2013–14 UEFA Europa League, in which the club was however defeated by Estoril Praia.

Since the 2014–15 season, the first men's team no longer plays independently, but under the name LASK Juniors OÖ (until 2017 SPG FC Pasching/LASK Juniors) in a syndicate with the second men's team of LASK Linz in the third-rate Regionalliga Mitte. With the return to the 2. Liga for the 2018–19 season, the club are again an independent team.

History

2007–2012: Road to the Regionalliga

The club started as a syndicate with the SV Wallern in the 2007–08 season in the fifth-highest Austrian level. After the immediate championship title and the associated promotion to the fourth division, the OÖ Liga, Wallern, restarted in the lowest league, and the club was financially compensated for the downgrade.

After the immediate title in the 2008–09 Oberösterreich Liga, the third-highest class, The FC Pasching was promoted to the Regionalliga Mitte.

In the season 2009–10, the FC Pasching had by far the highest average age of the entire Regionalliga Mitte (27.5 years). There were eleven players in the squad during this season, who had already passed the age of 30. Two of them (Josef Schicklgruber and Eduard Glieder) were already over 40 years old.

After the first round of the 2009–10 season Pasching was four points behind the leaders WAC/St. Andrä on the second place in the table. However, the club announced that it did not want to apply for a license for the First League. After the predecessor ASKÖ Pasching was relocated to Carinthia, the Bundesliga introduced a rule that prohibited a club promotion to the Erste Liga, unless it has played at least three years in a league that is played by his national association. Since the FC Pasching had played until then only one year each in the highest and second highest Upper Austrian level, the club did not meet this condition.

Pasching achieved the championship title in the Regionalliga 2010. Because of the waiver of a license application for the Erste Liga, the club was deducted 13 points. After the season, the club board resigned; a new board had to be elected.

As at the end of the season 2010–11 Superfund stepped out as the main sponsor and could not be adequately replaced, the club was forced to cut the budget for the next season massively together. Consequently, almost the entire professional squad was replaced by a new one, which consisted mainly of amateur players. At the end of the autumn season Pasching was in last place. In early 2012, a cooperation with Red Bull Salzburg was entered. The first consequence of this collaboration was the acquisition of the coaching office by Gerald Baumgartner, the former coach of the second team of Salzburg. The club managed thanks to an 8–0 victory in the last game against the already established as a champion Grazer AK the league.

2012–2014: Cup win and decline

In the 2012–13 season, Pasching was back at the other end of the table. The team won the autumn championship and went into the winter break four points ahead of LASK Linz. However, this advantage was lost in the spring and Pasching finished the season two points behind Linz in second place.

In the 2012–13 Austrian Cup, Pasching achieved the biggest sensation in the history of the competition. After Austria Salzburg, Austria Lustenau and Austria Klagenfurt were eliminated in the first three rounds, the elite of Austrian football waited for the regional league team in the last three rounds. In the quarter finals, Pasching beat Rapid Wien 1–0 away from home. In the semi-final, they faced cooperation partner Red Bull Salzburg away from home and turned a 0–1 deficit into a 2–1 victory, becoming the first team from the third division to reach the final of the ÖFB Cup in its 94-year history. The opponent in the final at the Ernst-Happel-Stadion in  Vienna was Austria Wien. Daniel Sobkova scored shortly after half time giving Pasching a 1–0 lead, which they defended to win the final. Thus, FC Pasching defeated the champion, the runner-up and third team in the Bundesliga season 2012–13, without ever having had the home advantage for themselves. The Cup victory saw the Upper Austrians qualify for the 2013–14 UEFA Europa League play-off round, where they met the Portuguese club Estoril Praia and lost with two defeats.

In early September 2013, coach Gerald Baumgartner moved to SKN St. Pölten and the former co-coach Martin Hiden took over the team. In the 2013–14 Austrian Cup, Pasching beat Bundesliga side, FC Wacker Innsbruck, in the second round before they lost against Wolfsberger AC on penalties in the third round. In the championship, the season goal of winning the championship was missed, with LASK finishing in first place again.

2014–2018: Syndicate with LASK and renaming
Even before that it became clear that Red Bull would leave Pasching as a sponsor. As a result, the club entered into a cooperation with LASK, which meant joint youth-team work and the use of the Pasching training center by LASK Linz. After promotion and the return of LASK to professional football, it was announced in June 2014 that FC Pasching – in the 2014–15 season under the name SPG FC Pasching/LASK Juniors – would compete in a syndicate with the second team of the Linz club. Associated with this was the replacement of the entire squad and the loss of a separate team. The syndicate club were not eligible for promotion.

In the debut season of the syndicate, the team in the third-tier Regionalliga gained 43 points to finish 9th place in the table. In the 2015–16 season, the team was able to improve their point yield and finished with 50 points in 5th place. In the 2016–17 season, the syndicate won only 31 points and finished just one place above the relegation zone in 14th.

Before the 2017–18 season, the syndicate was realigned to better attract talent from Upper Austria. In July 2017, FC Pasching was renamed FC Juniors OÖ. The syndicate changed its name to LASK Juniors OÖ. In addition, the former hobby club SV Pasching 16 was incorporated into the FC Juniors OÖ and since then formed the second team, which plays under the name SV Pasching 16 OÖ Juniors in the eighth-tier 2. Klasse Nord-Ost.

Since 2018: Present
After the rise of LASK Juniors OÖ in the 2. Liga in the 2017–18 season, the syndicate is dissolved. The FC Juniors OÖ will play as an independent club in the second league, but continue to cooperate with the LASK.

Past seasons

FC Pasching

LASK Juniors OÖ

FC Juniors OÖ

Honours

League
Austrian 2. Landesliga (V)
Winners (1): 2008–09

Cup
Austrian Cup
Winners (1): 2012–13

European competition history

Results

Source: UEFA.com, Last updated on 8 March 2018Pld = Matches played; W = Matches won; D = Matches drawn; L = Matches lost; GF = Goals for; GA = Goals against; GD = Goal Difference.

Players

Current squad

Out on loan

Coaching staff

Managerial history

  Helmut Wartinger (2007–2010)
  Rudolf Geir (2010–2011)
  Fuad Djulic (interim) (2011)
  Erwin Spiegel (2011)
  Sandu Bors (interim) (2011)
  Adolf Pinter (2011)
  Gerald Baumgartner (2012–2013)
  Martin Hiden (2013–2015)
  Mario Messner (2015)
  Ronald Brunmayr (2015–present)

External links
 Official Site

References 

 
Football clubs in Austria
Sport in Upper Austria
Association football clubs established in 2007
2007 establishments in Austria

lt:FC Superfund